Hyundai Motor Europe GmbH is the European division of South Korean automaker Hyundai Motor Company, its headquarters is in Offenbach am Main, Germany. It has a R&D center in Frankfurt and three manufacturing plants: one in Nošovice, Czech Republic; one in Saint Petersburg, Russia; and one in Turkey. Three models (Hyundai Accent, Hyundai Elantra, and Hyundai Santa Fe) were produced at the TagAZ's plant in Taganrog. Its slogan for the European Market is "New Thinking, New Possibilities".

Czech Republic 
In November 2008, Hyundai opened its European plant, Hyundai Motor Manufacturing Czech s r.o. (HMMC) in Nošovice, Czech Republic, following an investment of over 1 billion euros and over two years of construction. The plant, which mainly manufactures the i30, ix20, ix35 for the European market, has an annual capacity of 300,000 cars. The new Hyundai plant is 90 kilometres north of Kia Motors' Žilina Plant in Slovakia.

Germany 
Hyundai has been operating an R&D centre in Frankfurt, Germany since 1994, that has been responsible for monitoring technology developments in Europe and designing and engineering new cars for the European market. In September 2003, the company opened its new European headquarters in Rüsselsheim, after an investment worth 50 million euro. The site became the new location for the R&D centre and for the world rally team of the company.

Russia 
In Russia, the production of the Hyundai Accent, Sonata, Elantra and Santa Fe models has been taking place at the TagAZ plant, located in Taganrog, since 2001, in the form of complete knock-down kits assembly. Since 2006, the factory has also been assembling the Hyundai Porter, County, Aero Town and the HD 500 commercial vehicles.

In June 2008, Hyundai started the construction of a new manufacturing plant in Saint Petersburg with a planned yearly capacity of 100,000 cars, that will eventually be increased to 200,000 units. It started mass production in January 2011, with two models: the Hyundai Solaris and the Kia Rio.

History in Europe
Hyundai first imported passenger cars to Europe in 1978 with the launch of its Pony on several left-hand drive markets, with the right-hand drive version launching the brand on the British market in 1982. By 1984, Hyundai had launched a second model on the European market – the Stellar, a large rear-wheel drive family saloon based loosely on the Ford Cortina chassis. It was even advertised on the UK market as the spiritual successor to the Cortina. By 1990, with sales steadily rising across the continent, Hyundai was now a four-model brand in Europe, having launched the flagship Sonata saloon and Scoupe sports model onto the European market.

The 1980s Hyundai models were duly replaced during the 1990s, with the 1996 Hyundai Coupe being well received by the European motoring press.

Growing demand for MPVs and SUVs by the turn of the 21st century saw Hyundai venture into these new or expanding market sectors. By 2018, it was importing nine passenger vehicle ranges (some with two or more bodystyles) and two commercial vehicles ranges in Europe.

Hyundai has been particularly successful on the UK market since launching there in 1982. Its millionth UK market model was sold in 2015. Sales peaked at more than 93,000 units in 2017.

References

External links 
 Hyundai Motor Europe

Europe
Offenbach am Main
Vehicle manufacturing companies established in 2000
2000 establishments in Europe